Brukman may refer to:

 Brukman factory, textile factory in Balvanera, Buenos Aires, Argentina
 Jill Brukman (born 1973), South African backstroke- and medley swimmer

See also
 Bruckmann
 Brugmann
 Brugman
 Bruchmann

Germanic-language surnames